Football at the 1912 Summer Olympics was one of the 102 events at the 1912 Summer Olympics in Stockholm, Sweden. It was the fourth time that football was on the Olympic schedule and the tournament was entered by 13 nations, all from Europe:  Belgium withdrew two weeks before the draw, while France withdrew a few days after the draw; their opponents, Norway, were awarded a 2–0 victory.

Great Britain won the gold medals, representing the United Kingdom of Great Britain and Ireland (whom the IOC credits). Replicating the 1908 tournament, Denmark won silver medals and the Netherlands won bronze medals.

The Swedish Football Association ran the tournament, just as the English Football Association had organised the 1908 Olympic football competition in London, England. Three stadiums hosted the eleven matches of the main tournament from 29 June to 4 July 1912. Two were played at Tranebergs Idrottsplats in a suburb of Stockholm, five including the bronze medal match took place at Råsunda Idrottsplats, also outside Stockholm, and four including the final match were held at the Olympiastadion.

Seven teams were eliminated in two rounds ending with the quarterfinal matches, 30 June, and these teams played off in a consolation tournament from 1 July to 5 July, comprising six matches at the same three stadiums. Hungary won the consolation tournament.

Competition schedule

Venues

Participants

The tournament attracted a record 13 entries that were accepted, all of them from Europe. A fourteenth entry of Bohemia was rejected, as only nations or associations affiliated with FIFA were admitted. France and Belgium withdrew shortly before the draw, or assignment of places in the main tournament, leaving a record 11 contestants.

The Football Association entered a Great Britain national amateur team to represent the United Kingdom (Great Britain and Ireland).

A total of 135+28 footballers from 11 nations competed at the Stockholm Games:

 
 
  Grand Duchy of Finland, Russian Empire 
 
  UK of Great Britain and Ireland

Course of the tournament 
In the first round of the tournament, the hosts from Sweden went out in the opening match against the Netherlands. Fighting back from a 1–3 deficit with half an hour to go, Sweden only lost 4–3 on a goal scored by Dutch player Jan Vos in extra time. At Tranebergs Idrottsplats, Austrian football pioneer Hugo Meisl was the referee as Finland beat Italy, also in extra time.

In the second round, Finland won again, this time beating Russia, who had received a bye in the first round. By this stage, Great Britain team entered the contest, drawn to play against Hungary at Olympiastadion. Great Britain was captained by Vivian Woodward, a record-scoring centre-forward from Chelsea, who had formed part of Great Britain's gold medal winning side of the 1908 Summer Olympics. Led by forward Harold Walden, who scored six goals, Great Britain defeated Hungary by 7–0.

In the semi-final round, Walden scored all four goals as Great Britain defeated Finland 4–0. In the other semi-final Denmark beat the Netherlands 4–1; the Dutch consolation goal put behind goalkeeper Sophus Hansen by Danish defender Harald Hansen. For the second successive time, the final would pair Great Britain with Denmark, and like in 1908, the team representing Great Britain would win gold medals, although this game would be closer than the 4–2 score-line suggested. With no rule allowing substitutions, Denmark played with ten men after  the 30th minute when Charles Buchwald was injured and had to be taken from the pitch on a stretcher.

A consolation tournament ran conjunctively with the tournament proper paired the losers of the first and second rounds, and was eventually won by Hungary, although no medals were awarded for the top three finishers in that tournament.

German player Gottfried Fuchs equalled the record for most goals in an international (set by Dane Sophus Nielsen in the 1908 Olympics) with 10 goals for Germany against Russia; this record stood until 2001.

Bracket

Match details

First round

Quarter-finals

Semi-finals

Bronze Medal match

Final

Final summary

Medallists 
The database of the International Olympic Committee lists only the eleven players as medalists for each nation, who played in the first match for their nation. The following list contains these eleven players, as well as all other players who made at least one appearance for their team during the tournament.

Consolation tournament

First round

Semi-finals

Final

Statistics

Goalscorers 

10 goals

  Gottfried Fuchs (Germany)

9 goals

  Harold Walden (Great Britain)

8 goals

  Jan Vos (Netherlands)

7 goals

  Anthon Olsen (Denmark)

5 goals

  Fritz Förderer (Germany)

4 goals

  Imre Schlosser (Hungary)

3 goals

  Leopold Grundwald (Austria)
  Nico Bouvy (Netherlands)

2 goals

  Robert Merz (Austria)
  Alois Müller (Austria)
  Sophus Nielsen (Denmark)
  Jarl Öhman (Finland)
  Bror Wiberg (Finland)
  Gordon Hoare (Great Britain)
  Vivian Woodward (Great Britain)
  Franco Bontadini (Italy)
  Huug de Groot (Netherlands)
  Jan van der Sluis (Netherlands)
  Iwar Swensson (Sweden)

1 goal

  Robert Cimera (Austria)
  Ludwig Hussak (Austria)
  Leopold Neubauer (Austria)
  Jan Studnicka (Austria)
  Leopold Studnicka (Austria)
  Poul Nielsen (Denmark)
  Emil Jørgensen (Denmark)
  Nils Middelboe (Denmark)
  Vilhelm Wolfhagen (Denmark)
  Eino Soinio (Finland)
  Karl Burger (Germany)
  Adolf Jäger (Germany)
  Emil Oberle (Germany)
  Arthur Berry (Great Britain)
  Mihály Pataki (Hungary)
  Sándor Bodnár (Hungary)
  Felice Berardo (Italy)
  Enrico Sardi (Italy)
  Caesar ten Cate (Netherlands)
  Vasily Butusov (Russian Empire)
  Erik Börjesson (Sweden)

Own goals
  Harald Hansen (Denmark; playing against Netherlands)
  Jalmari Holopainen (Finland; playing against Great Britain)

Notes

References

 
1912
Football
1912 in association football
1912
1911–12 in English football
1911–12 in Dutch football
1911–12 in Danish football
1911–12 in Swedish football
1911–12 in Austrian football
1911–12 in French football
 
1911–12 in Italian football
1912 in Norwegian football
1912 in Finnish football
1911–12 in Hungarian football